James Elijah Saxon (born March 23, 1966) is an American football coach and former fullback who is the former running backs coach for the Arizona Cardinals of the National Football League (NFL). He previously served as an assistant coach for the Pittsburgh Steelers, Minnesota Vikings, Miami Dolphins, Kansas City Chiefs and Buffalo Bills.

Saxon played college football at San Jose State and was drafted by the Kansas City Chiefs in the sixth round of the 1988 NFL Draft. He played for eight seasons in the NFL with the Chiefs, Miami Dolphins and Philadelphia Eagles.

Early life
Born in Beaufort, South Carolina, James Saxon graduated from Battery Creek High School in Burton, South Carolina in 1984.

Playing career

College
Saxon moved to Sacramento, California to attend American River College and played on its football team from 1984 to 1985. Then, Saxon transferred to San Jose State University. Saxon played for the San Jose State Spartans football team in 1986 and 1987 as running back and was part of the Spartans' 1986 California Bowl championship team. James Saxon also has a son named Devin Saxon, some people may know him as a Football Player on the Harvard Crimson Football Team. Others may recognize him as "Mr. Minnesota" from the 2012 Cosmo's Bachelor of the Year.

National Football League
Saxon was selected in the sixth round of the 1988 NFL Draft as the 135th overall pick. As a fullback, Saxon played for the Kansas City Chiefs from 1988 to 1991, Miami Dolphins from 1992 to 1994, and Philadelphia Eagles in 1995.

Coaching career

Early career
In 1997, Saxon got his first coaching job as running backs coach at Rutgers University, a position he would have for two years. Saxon also served as a training camp coaching intern for the Kansas City Chiefs in 1998. In 1999, Saxon was a volunteer assistant coach for Menlo College.

Buffalo Bills
In 2000, Saxon was hired by the Buffalo Bills as their running backs coach.

Kansas City Chiefs
In 2001, Saxon was hired by the Kansas City Chiefs as their running backs coach. He would serve in that position until 2007.

Miami Dolphins
In 2008, Saxon was hired by the Miami Dolphins as their running backs coach and would serve in that position until 2009.

Minnesota Vikings
In 2010, Saxon was hired by the Minnesota Vikings as their running backs coach.

Pittsburgh Steelers
In 2014, Saxon was hired by the Pittsburgh Steelers as their running backs coach under head coach Mike Tomlin.

Arizona Cardinals
On January 14, 2019, Saxon was hired by the Arizona Cardinals as their running backs coach under head coach Kliff Kingsbury. Saxon kept his job with the Cardinals until his arrest for sexual assault incident in May 2022 became public Aug. 4, when he was put on administrative leave. Saxon resigned in October.

References

External links
 Arizona Cardinals profile 

1966 births
Living people
American football fullbacks
American River Beavers football players
Buffalo Bills coaches
Kansas City Chiefs coaches
Kansas City Chiefs players
Miami Dolphins coaches
Miami Dolphins players
People from Beaufort, South Carolina
Philadelphia Eagles players
Players of American football from South Carolina
Rutgers Scarlet Knights football coaches
San Jose State Spartans football players
Menlo Oaks football coaches
Minnesota Vikings coaches
Pittsburgh Steelers coaches
Arizona Cardinals coaches